Peter Malnati (born June 13, 1987) is an American professional golfer who plays on the PGA Tour. His sole victory on the PGA Tour came at the 2015 Sanderson Farms Championship. He previously played on the Korn Ferry Tour (then known as the Web.com Tour), where he is a two-time winner.

Early years and amateur career
Malnati was born in New Castle, Indiana and grew up in Dandridge, Tennessee, where he attended Jefferson County High School. He played college golf at the University of Missouri. He turned professional in 2009.

Professional career
Malnati played on mini-tours until earning special temporary membership on the Web.com Tour (equivalent to 100th on the previous season's money list) in 2013. He won his seventh tournament of the 2013 season at the News Sentinel Open. He finished 18th on the 2013 Web.com Tour regular-season money list to earn his 2014 PGA Tour card.

In 2014, Malnati finished 178th in the FedEx Cup points list on the PGA Tour, thus losing his card, and failed to regain his card at the Web.com Tour Finals. He returned to the Web.com Tour for the 2015 season, earning his second win on the tour at the Brasil Champions en route to finishing fourth on the regular-season money list and regaining his PGA Tour card for the following season.

In November 2015, Malnati earned his maiden PGA Tour victory by winning the Sanderson Farms Championship by one stroke over William McGirt and David Toms after a Monday finish to the tournament. He shot a five-under round of 67 to come from one behind to take the victory over a crowded leaderboard. The win earned Malnati an exemption on the PGA Tour through the end of the 2018 season.

Amateur wins
2009 Tennessee Amateur

Professional wins (6)

PGA Tour wins (1)

Web.com Tour wins (2)

Web.com Tour playoff record (0–1)

Other wins (3)
2008 Missouri Open (as an amateur)
2010 Nebraska Open
2011 Nebraska Open

Results in major championships
Results not in chronological order in 2020.

CUT = missed the halfway cut
NT = No tournament due to COVID-19 pandemic

Results in The Players Championship

CUT = missed the halfway cut
"T" = Tied
C = Canceled after the first round due to the COVID-19 pandemic

See also
2013 Web.com Tour Finals graduates
2015 Web.com Tour Finals graduates
2018 Web.com Tour Finals graduates

References

External links

American male golfers
Missouri Tigers men's golfers
PGA Tour golfers
Korn Ferry Tour graduates
Golfers from Indiana
Golfers from Tennessee
People from New Castle, Indiana
People from Dandridge, Tennessee
1987 births
Living people